The Kanak are the indigenous Melanesian inhabitants of New Caledonia. 

Kanak may also refer to:

 Kanak Peak, a mountain in Antarctica
 Orang Kanaq, a Proto-Malay Orang Asli group of people also known as Kanaq or Kanak people
 Kanake or Kanaker, a derogatory word used in German-speaking countries
 Kanak Chanpa Chakma (born 1963), Bangladeshi artist
 Katharine Kanak (born ), American atmospheric scientist

See also
 Baduy people, a branch of the Sundanese people also known as Kanekes people
 Canuck /kəˈnʌk/, a slang term for a Canadian
 Kanaka (disambiguation)